The Sacramento State Hornets football program is the intercollegiate American football team for the California State University, Sacramento located in Sacramento, California. The team competes in the NCAA Division I Football Championship Subdivision (FCS) and are members of the Big Sky Conference. The school's first football team was fielded in 1954. The team plays its home games at the 21,195-seat Hornet Stadium.

History
In 1954, Dave Strong was named the first football coach for the Hornets football program. The program's first victory came in their second season, in 1955, when the Hornets defeated Southern Oregon by a point. Sacramento State was first affiliated with the Northern California Athletic Conference, from 1954 through 1984; the conference was known as the Far Western Conference until 1982. The Hornets were then members of the Western Football Conference from 1985 through 1992. In 1993, Sacramento State move the American West Conference, and then to the Big Sky Conference in 1996. Hornet Stadium has been home to the football team since 1969.

Past success and notable games
The Sacramento State Hornets football team were ranked for the first time ever in school history at the end of the 2019 season when they placed No. 3 nationally in both the STATS FCS Top 25 poll and the FCS Coaches poll as part of the 2019 NCAA Division I FCS football rankings. Sacramento State was also ranked as the No. 4 team in the 2019 NCAA Division I Football FCS Football Official Bracket, receiving a first-week bye in their road to the finals. The 2019 season was a major milestone in the teams' history as the season brought Sacramento State its first-ever Big Sky Conference Championship, its fifth conference title overall, and its first-ever appearance in the FCS Football Championship playoff series. Prior to the 2019 season, Sacramento State was never ranked at the end of any season but had won four conference titles.

The Hornets have participated in two bowl games, the Pasadena Bowl in 1968 against Grambling State, where the Hornets lost, 34–7, and the Camellia Bowl in 1964, where Montana State defeated the Hornets, 28–7.

One of Sac State's most notable wins came on September 3, 2011, in the season opener against the Oregon State Beavers of the Pac-12 Conference at Reser Stadium. The Hornets upset the Beavers in overtime, 29–28 with a two-point conversion pass from quarterback Jeff Flemming to wide receiver Brandyn Reed, beating an AQ conference team for the first time in school history in front of an announced crowd of 41,581. The Beavers were a 23-point favorite coming into the game. Four weeks after the win over Oregon State, the Hornets defeated FCS national power Montana, the program's first win ever over the Grizzlies, on September 24, 2011. Hornets defeated the then No. 10 ranked Grizzlies by a score of 42–28 in Hornet Stadium.

On September 8, 2012, Sac State defeated Colorado Buffaloes of the Pac-12 conference, at Folsom Field as 20-point underdogs. Colorado jumped to an early 14–0 start but the Hornets quickly answered back with a pair of touchdown passes from Hornets quarterback Garrett Safron and a 2-yard rushing touchdown by A.J. Ellis to lead 21–14 over the Buffaloes. Sac State led 24–21 during intermission. With less than a minute left in the fourth quarter and down 28–27, Hornet's walk-on kicker, Edgar Castenada, made the 31-yard field goal winning kick for a final score of 30–28. After the game, Hornets head coach Marshall Sperbeck announced in the locker room that Sacramento State has offered Castendada a scholarship. This marked a consecutive year in which Sac State faced an AQ conference school (both in the Pac-12 conference) as heavy underdogs on the road and walked out with victories.

On November 23, 2019, the Sacramento State football team clinched the schools' first-ever share of the Big Sky Conference Championship in a 27–17 victory over the UC Davis Aggies football team in the 2019 Causeway Classic game under the leadership of 1st season head coach Troy Taylor. This win served as Sacramento States' first Big Sky Conference Championship win since the team's induction into the Big Sky Conference in 1996.

Classification history
 1954–1955: No classification
 1956–1972: NCAA College Division
 1973–1992: NCAA Division II
 1993–present: NCAA Division I-AA/FCS

Conference affiliations
 Far Western Conference (1954–1982)
  Northern California Athletic Conference (1983–1984)
 Western Football Conference (1985–1992)
 American West Conference (1993–1995)
 Big Sky Conference (1996–present)

Championships

Conference championships

Postseason results

Division II playoffs
The Hornets made one appearance in the Division II Playoffs. Their record was 2–1.

Division I FCS playoffs
The Hornets have made three appearances in the FCS Playoffs. Their record is 1–3.

Bowl games

Home stadiums

1955-1958
Grant Stadium -Sacramento, CA
Capacity (8,000)

1954, 1959-1968
Hughes Stadium -East Sacramento, CA
Capacity (20,311)

Charles C. Hughes Stadium (commonly referred to as Hughes Stadium) is an outdoor stadium located at Sacramento City College. The stadium opened in 1928 and was initially known as Sacramento Stadium and Sacramento College Stadium. 

It was renamed in November 1944 in honor of Charles Colfax Hughes, the first superintendent of the Sacramento City Unified School District, who died a month earlier.
In 2012, the stadium underwent a major overhaul, installing an artificial turf field surface, a new track surface, and a major refurbishment of the facilities documented in this video. Its present seating capacity 

1969-current
Hornet Stadium -Sacramento, CA
Capacity (21,195)

Fred Anderson Field at Hornet Stadium is a 21,195-seat college football and track stadium on the campus of California State University, Sacramento (Sacramento State). It opened  on September 20, 1969, it has also been the home stadium of the Sacramento Surge of the WLAF, the Sacramento Gold Miners of the Canadian Football League and the Sacramento Mountain Lions of the United Football League. It hosted the U.S. Olympic Trials for track and field in 2000 and 2004.

The field was natural grass for its first 41 seasons; FieldTurf was installed in 2010.
In 1998, Permanent chairbacks were installed in Section 213 at the 50–yard line. In 2000 The stadium underwent a $1 million improvement in preparation for the U.S. Track and Field Olympic Trials; An Olympic–sized track was installed surrounding the field as well as a practice track north of the stadium. In 2003 New scoreboard installed. In 2007 new public entrances were installed. IN 2008 Broad Fieldhouse opened, which included new offices, locker rooms, athletic training room, weight room and a VIP patio. In 2010 natural grass was replaced by FieldTurf Duraspine Pro, "The Well" opened next to the north end zone which provided paved areas for concessions and a Jumbotron was added below the scoreboard.
On July 17, 1993, it was the site of the first regular season Canadian Football League (CFL) game ever played on American soil, where the Calgary Stampeders defeated the Gold Miners 38–36. Fred Anderson Field also hosted the largest crowd ever to witness an event at Fred Anderson Field  was when the Sacramento Surge defeated the Barcelona Dragons in the World League playoffs on May 30, 1992 in front of 26,445 fans.
The largest Sacramento State football crowd occurred on November 19, 2022 when 23,073 fans saw the Hornets complete an 11-0 season with a 27-21 victory over UC Davis in the Causeway Classic

Rivalries

UC Davis

The Hornets plays the rival UC Davis Aggies, annually and usually the last game of the regular season. This rivalry game is known as The Causeway Classic, and each team competes for the Causeway Trophy, referring to the fact that the schools are connected by the long Yolo Causeway bridge over Yolo Bypass flood way. UC Davis leads the series 46–23. This game has drawn crowds up to 24,000 in the Hornet Stadium, and is widely popular in the local area.

Cal Poly
"Green and Gold Rivalry"

While not commemorated with a trophy, Cal Poly and Sacramento State are designated as 'protected rivals' in scheduling by the Big Sky Conference, meaning they are guaranteed to play each other in foreseeable schedules. From 1967 to 2022, the Mustangs and Hornets have met 41 times, with Cal Poly holding a narrow lead all-time, 21–20.

Other notable rivalries includes Portland State, Eastern Washington, Weber State, the Montana schools, Montana, Montana State and Big Sky conference foes. Also, regional rival Pacific before they discontinued their football program in 1995.

Head coaches

College Football Hall of Fame

National Award winners
Eddie Robinson Award

The Eddie Robinson Award is awarded annually to college football's top head coach in the NCAA Division I Football Championship Subdivision (formerly Division I-AA). It was established in 1987.

Past Hornets in the NFL

 Otis Amey, San Francisco 49ers (2005)
 McLeod Bethel-Thompson, Minnesota Vikings & San Francisco 49ers (2011–2016)
 DaRon Bland, Dallas Cowboys (2022–present)
 DeAndre Carter, Los Angeles Chargers (2015–present)
 Mike Carter, Green Bay Packers (1970–1972)
 Tony Corbin, San Diego Chargers (1997)
 Todd Davis, New Orleans Saints & Denver Broncos (2014–2021)
 John Gesek, Los Angeles Raiders (1987–1995)
 Jon Kirksey, New Orleans Saints (1996)
 Lorenzo Lynch, Chicago Bears (1987–1997)
 Zack Nash, Arizona Cardinals (2012)
 Lonie Paxton, Denver Broncos (2000–2011)
 Darnell Sankey, Indianapolis Colts & New Orleans Saints (2016-2019)
 Kato Serwanga, New England Patriots (1998–2003)
 Wasswa Serwanga, San Francisco 49ers (1999–2001)
 Daimon Shelton, Jacksonville Jaguars (1997–2006)

Notable former players
Most notable alumni include:
 Clancy Barone
 DeAndre Carter
 Ryan Coogler
 Todd Davis
 Bobby Fresques
 Aaron Garcia
 John Gesek
 Lorenzo Lynch
 Ricky Ray
 Charles Roberts
 Daimon Shelton
John Kilgariff 2022 HOF inductee

References

External links
 

 
American football teams established in 1954
1954 establishments in California